Ralph Telford O'Neal, OBE (15 December 1933 – 11 November 2019) was a British Virgin Islander politician. He was the longest ever serving elected representative in the British Virgin Islands, and served as Chief Minister (when the office was so titled) or Premier of the British Virgin Islands for three terms.

Politics

Ralph O'Neal was first elected to represent the district for Virgin Gorda and Anegada on 1 September 1975, and he held that seat continuously until the 2015 general election. Ralph O'Neal indicated in 2014 that he would stand down at the 2015 general election.

Ralph O'Neal was first appointed Chief Minister when Lavity Stoutt died in office on 14 May 1995.  He then served as Chief Minister until the 1999 general election, which he won.  His party would later lose the 2003 general election, but he would return to power as Premier (as the office was renamed) for the third and final time following a landslide victory in the 2007 general election.  He remained in office until 7 November 2011, after the Virgin Islands Party lost its majority following the 2011 general election.  His combined 12 years as head of the elected Government is the second longest in the British Virgin Islands, behind only Lavity Stoutt.

Ralph O'Neal also served as Leader of the Opposition in the British Virgin Islands on three occasions – more than any other politician.  He first served as opposition leader for the United Party from 1986 to 1988.  He then served in the role for the Virgin Islands party from 2003 to 2007, and then finally from 2011 to 2015.

For most of his political career Ralph O'Neal was a member of the Virgin Islands Party, and he led the party from the time of Lavity Stoutt's death, until he stepped down as party leader and was replaced by Julian Fraser.  However, like most BVI politicians, Ralph O'Neal has "crossed the floor".  He contested his first election, the 1971 general election, unsuccessfully on behalf of the VI Democratic Party.  He then ran for office twice as an independent candidate before joining the Virgin Islands Party.  Then, in 1983, he left to join the ruling United Party, and contested the 1986 general election on behalf of the United Party.  He later rejoined the Virgin Islands Party in 1988 to take up a Ministerial position in Lavity Stoutt's government and was a member of the Virgin Islands party ever since.

Personal

Ralph O'Neal was educated at University of Oxford where he studied economics. He was also property owner and developer in the British Virgin Islands.  Apart from his property investments, O'Neal had a number of other commercial interests during his life before serving in the House of Assembly under the Ralph O'Neal Group of Companies.

In October 2016 O'Neal was flown overseas for emergency medical treatment after reportedly suffering a stroke.

O'Neal died at his home in the McNamara area of Tortola on 11 November 2019.

Electoral history

References

|-

1933 births
2019 deaths
British Virgin Islands politicians
Leaders of the Opposition (British Virgin Islands)
Members of the House of Assembly of the British Virgin Islands
Officers of the Order of the British Empire
People from Virgin Gorda
Premiers of the British Virgin Islands
United Party (British Virgin Islands) politicians
VI Democratic Party politicians
Virgin Islands Party politicians